Warren Stanley Rychel (born May 12, 1967) is a Canadian former professional ice hockey left winger who played eight seasons in the National Hockey League. He was hired as the head coach of the Barrie Colts of the Ontario Hockey League in 2019.

Playing career
Rychel was primarily an enforcer, and thus drew 1,422 career penalty minutes and did not score many goals. He only scored 38 goals and 77 points in his NHL career. However, he did have a few memorable offensive outbursts, especially in the Stanley Cup playoffs.

In the 1991 playoffs, after playing the whole season in the minor leagues, Rychel was called up to play with the Chicago Blackhawks and had only two games of previous NHL experience. He managed to score a goal and four points in only three games. In the 1993 playoffs, Rychel was playing with the Los Angeles Kings, and that season had played his first full season in the NHL. He scored 6 goals and 13 points in 23 playoff games, including two game-winning goals, and once again helped his team to the Stanley Cup Finals. However, Rychel did manage to win the Stanley Cup in 1996 when he was playing with the Colorado Avalanche. Rychel retired from the NHL in 1999.

Hockey executive
Rychel was the general manager of the Windsor Spitfires teams that won the 2009 Memorial Cup, 2010 Memorial Cup, and the 2017 Memorial Cup championships. As of 2017, Rychel became one of only three general managers to assemble three Memorial Cup winning teams; the others are Matt Leyden of the Oshawa Generals, and Bob Brown of the Kamloops Blazers. 

After spending 13 years with the Spitfires, Rychel announced in July 2019 that he was selling his minority interest in the Ontario Hockey League team and stepping down as general manager.

Personal life
Rychel's son, Kerby, was drafted by the Columbus Blue Jackets 19th overall in the first round of the 2013 NHL Entry Draft. Kerby was later traded to the Toronto Maple Leafs, Montreal Canadiens, and Calgary Flames.

Career statistics

Regular season and playoffs

Coaching record

Ontario Hockey League

References

External links

1967 births
Arizona Coyotes scouts
Canadian ice hockey left wingers
Chicago Blackhawks players
Colorado Avalanche players
Guelph Platers players
Ice hockey people from Ontario
Indianapolis Ice players
Kalamazoo Wings (1974–2000) players
Kitchener Rangers players
Living people
Los Angeles Kings players
Mighty Ducks of Anaheim players
Moncton Hawks players
Ottawa 67's players
People from Strathroy-Caradoc
Peoria Rivermen (IHL) players
Saginaw Hawks players
Stanley Cup champions
Sudbury Wolves players
Toronto Maple Leafs players
Undrafted National Hockey League players